O'Brien is a former mining town in eastern Ontario near Gowganda with a warm-summer humid continental (Dfb) Köppen climate classification. The mining town serviced several mines including silver mines around nearby lake Miller Lake; one of the past-producing silver mines was Ontario's largest producing Cobalt-style silver mine outside of Cobalt, with historical production of 40.7 million ounces of silver between 1910 and 1972.

References 

Mining communities in Ontario
Geography of Timiskaming District
Former towns in Ontario